Nardi Simpson (born 1975) is a Yuwaalaraay musician and writer in Australia. She is a founding member of the Indigenous folk group Stiff Gins. Her debut novel, Song of the Crocodile, was published in 2020.

Early life and education 
Nardi Simpson was born in Sydney in 1975. Her family is Yuwaalaraay Aboriginal Australian from New South Wales, and she spent a significant portion of her childhood visiting the area.

After attending Eora College, she graduated from the University of Sydney with a bachelor's degree in Aboriginal studies.

Music 
Simpson has been a musician for over two decades. She is a member of the Indigenous folk group Stiff Gins, which she co-founded in 1999. The group has produced several recordings, starting with their debut EP Soh Fa in 1999 and their debut album Origins in 2001. She is also the founder of the Sydney-based Barayagal Choir.

In addition to performing, she is also a composer, described by ABC as "one of the most exciting Australian composers of her generation." She is currently pursuing a Ph.D. in composition from the Australian National University. In 2019 she began participating in the Ngarra Burria First Nations Composers Initiative.

Writing 
Simpson's debut novel, Song of the Crocodile, was published 2020. Song of the Crocodile tells the story of three generations of women in the same family navigating tensions between Indigenous and settler families as their town grows, incorporating musical elements and the Yuwaalaraay language.

The novel received significant recognition, including being longlisted for the Stella Prize and Miles Franklin Award, and shortlisted for the Victorian Premier's Literary Award for Indigenous Writing and The Age's book of the year. It was the winner of the 2021 ALS Gold Medal and the 2021 University of Queensland Fiction Book Award.

Bibliography

Novels

Critical studies and reviews of Simpson's work
Song of the crocodile

References

External links 

 

1975 births
Living people
Australian women writers
Australian women musicians
Australian women composers
Indigenous Australian musicians
Indigenous Australian writers
Writers from Sydney
University of Sydney alumni
Musicians from Sydney